This is intended to be a complete list of properties and districts listed on the National Register of Historic Places on Manhattan Island below 14th Street, which is a significant portion of the New York City borough of Manhattan. In turn, the borough of Manhattan is coterminous with New York County, New York. For properties and districts in other parts of Manhattan Island, the mainland neighborhood of Marble Hill, and the other islands of New York County, see National Register of Historic Places listings in Manhattan. The locations of National Register properties and districts (at least for all showing latitude and longitude coordinates below) may be seen in an online map by clicking on "Map of all coordinates".

There are 187 properties and districts, including eight ships.



Listings in Manhattan below 14th Street

|}

See also
 County: National Register of Historic Places listings in New York County, New York
 State: National Register of Historic Places listings in New York
 Municipal: List of New York City Designated Landmarks in Manhattan below 14th Street

References

14